The 2011 Solomon Islands Champions League Playoff was a two-legged playoff for one spot in the 2011–12 OFC Champions League. The two teams that participated were Koloale, who won the 2010–11 Telekom S-League, and Solomon Warriors, who won the 2011 Knockout Championship. Koloale F.C. won and advanced to the Champions League.

References 

2011 Play-Off